is a Japanese freestyle skier. He competed in the men's moguls event at the 2002 Winter Olympics.

References

1977 births
Living people
Japanese male freestyle skiers
Olympic freestyle skiers of Japan
Freestyle skiers at the 2002 Winter Olympics
Sportspeople from Nagano Prefecture
21st-century Japanese people